Hextall is a surname. Notable people with the surname include:

Brett Hextall (born 1988), American ice hockey player, son of Ron
Bryan Hextall (1913–1984), Canadian ice hockey player
Bryan Hextall Jr. (born 1941), Canadian ice hockey player, son of Bryan Sr.
Dennis Hextall (born 1943), Canadian ice hockey player, son of Bryan Sr.
John Hextall (1861–1914), Canadian settler
Ron Hextall (born 1964), Canadian ice hockey player, son of Bryan Jr.

Other uses 
 The Hextalls, a Canadian pop punk band.